Tapureli  (former Tahtalı) is a village in Erdemli ilçe (district) of Mersin Province, Turkey. The population of the village was 1097   as of 2011. The village was founded in early 1800s by a Turkmen chieftain named Gökali. The name of the village refers to rocky landscape around.

References

Villages in Erdemli District